Linum sulcatum, common names yellow flax, grooved yellow flax, grooved flax, and yellow wild flax is a plant native to the United States and Canada.

Conservation status in the United States
It is listed as endangered in Connecticut, as rare in Indiana, as endangered in Maryland, New Jersey, and Pennsylvania, as threatened in New York (state), and as historical in Rhode Island.

References

Flora of the United States
sulcatum